Shingayi Kaondera (born 31 July 1982 in Seke, Zimbabwe) is a football midfielder.

Kaondera started his career in Darryn T in 1997. Between 1999 and 2002 he played for the Polish clubs Górnik Zabrze before signing for Cypriot Cypriot First Division outfit AEP Paphos during the 2005. In 2005–2006 he played for the Turkish club Gaziantepspor. Next season he moved back in Africa and in Supersport United in South African Premier Soccer League. In July 2007 he signed a two-year contract with the Cypriot club AEK Larnaca. However, in January 2008 moved to Nea Salamina.

External links
 

1982 births
Living people
Zimbabwean footballers
Zimbabwe international footballers
2006 Africa Cup of Nations players
AEP Paphos FC players
Nea Salamis Famagusta FC players
AEK Larnaca FC players
Digenis Akritas Morphou FC players
Chalkanoras Idaliou players
AEK Kouklia F.C. players
Górnik Zabrze players
Gaziantepspor footballers
Ekstraklasa players
Süper Lig players
Cypriot First Division players
Cypriot Second Division players
Zimbabwean expatriate footballers
Expatriate footballers in Turkey
Expatriate footballers in Cyprus
Expatriate footballers in Poland
Zimbabwean expatriate sportspeople in Poland
Association football midfielders